The Omar bin Al-Khattab Mosque or Curaçao Islamic Center is a mosque in Willemstad, Curaçao.

History
In 1963, construction started to transform the former estate of Plantersrust into a mosque. It was built without government support, but with donations from Muslims in Saudi Arabia, Libya and Trinidad and Tobago. Many of the Muslims in Curaçao are of Lebanese descent. In 1965, construction finished, and the mosque was officially opened on 1 May 1966 by governor Cola Debrot.

Architecture
The mosque has a capacity of 200 worshippers.

See also
 Islam in the Netherlands Antilles

References

External links
 

1965 establishments in Curaçao
Buildings and structures in Willemstad
Islam in the Caribbean
Mosques completed in 1965
Mosques in Central America
Religious buildings and structures in Curaçao
20th-century architecture in the Netherlands